Nahr ol Dowleh (also known as Dowleh) is a village in Kermajan Rural District, in the Central District of Kangavar County, Kermanshah Province, Iran. At the 2006 census, its population was 187, in 49 families.

References 

Populated places in Kangavar County